Michael Don Brandenburg (born October 1, 1956) is an American politician. He is a member of the North Dakota House of Representatives from the 28th District, serving since 2004. He is a member of the Republican party.  He also served from 1997 to 2002. Brandenburg was elected as a Democrat, but on October 2, 1997, he switched parties to join the Republican majority in his first session in the Legislature.

See also
 List of American politicians who switched parties in office

References

Living people
1956 births
People from Jamestown, North Dakota
Republican Party members of the North Dakota House of Representatives
21st-century American politicians